Eva Jones-Young (born July 14, 1964), better known as Eva Jones, is an American former professional boxer who competed between 1996 and 2009. She held the WIBF and IWBF bantamweight titles in 1998 and the IFBA bantamweight title in 1999.

On November 9, 1996, Jones began her professional boxing career, beating Deirdre Rodriguez by a four-round split decision in Cedar Rapids, Iowa. On March 3, 1997, she beat Anissa Zamarron by a four-round unanimous decision in Houston, Texas.

In her fifth fight, August 14, 1997, she suffered her first professional defeat, when she boxed Para Draine at Worley, Idaho, losing a four-round unanimous decision. But she rebounded from that loss with a first-round knockout, which was also her first career knockout victory, against top prospect, Kim Jeffryes, on September 9.

Jones won three more bouts, including Delia Gonzalez on October 24, 1997, whom Jones defeated in Tula, Mississippi by a unanimous six-round decision. Then on January 10, 1998 she faced IBA world Bantamweight champion Theresa Arnold for the vacant IWBF world Bantamweight title. Jones became a world champion and, at the same time, the only person to defeat Arnold as a professional, with a seventh-round knockout win in Atlantic City, New Jersey.

On March 24, 1998, she claimed the WIBF world Bantamweight title with a fourth-round knockout of Cheryll Robinson. After winning a non-title bout, she and Draine had a rematch, on November 12, 1998 in Kansas City, Missouri, and Jones avenged her defeat, handing Draine an eight-round decision loss in another non-title bout.

To defend her WIBF title, Jones travelled to Saint Thomas, U.S. Virgin Islands, where she lost the title to Margaret Sidoroff, by a ten-round split decision, on February 26, 1999.

Immediately after, she was given a second chance at becoming world Bantamweight champion, when she boxed "Downtown Leona Brown" for Brown's IFBA world Bantamweight championship, on June 11 of that same year. Jones became world Bantamweight champion for the second time, when she defeated Brown by a ten-round decision, in Bossier City, Louisiana.

On July 23, she beat Jamilia Lawrence by decision in a
non-title fight, but on February 5, 2000, she lost to Michele Aboro by a tenth-round knockout in Germany for the WIBF's vacant world Super Bantamweight fight, in what has been her last fight.

Professional boxing record

References 

1964 births
Living people
Boxers from Indiana
American women boxers
Sportspeople from South Bend, Indiana
World boxing champions
Bantamweight boxers
21st-century American women